Frank Vern Belote (October 8, 1883 – October 12, 1928) was an American  track and field athlete who competed in the 1912 Summer Olympics. He was born in Burr Oak, Michigan.

In 1912 he finished fifth in the 100 metres event and seventh in the standing high jump competition. He was also a member of the American relay team which was disqualified in the semi-finals of the 4x100 metre relay event after a baton-passing fault on the first transfer.

He died in October 1928 in Detroit, Michigan.

References

External links

1883 births
1928 deaths
American male sprinters
American male high jumpers
Olympic track and field athletes of the United States
Athletes (track and field) at the 1912 Summer Olympics
People from St. Joseph County, Michigan